Teen Mom: Family Reunion is a reality television series that is spun off from three of the network's reality shows, Teen Mom, Teen Mom 2, and Teen Mom: Young and Pregnant. The series premiered on January 11, 2022 on MTV.

On February 16, 2022, the series was renewed for a second season, with the entire cast, minus Messer, returning. Baltierra, who appeared as a guest in the first season, returned as a main cast member, and Sessler and Elliott from Teen Mom: Young and Pregnant joined the cast.

Cast
Amber Portwood
Ashley Jones
Briana DeJesus
Cheyenne Floyd
Jade Cline
Leah Messer (season 1)
Maci McKinney
Catelynn Baltierra (season 2; guest season 1)
Kayla Sessler (season 2)
Kiaya Elliott (season 2)

Guest
Farrah Abraham (season 1)

Episodes

Series overview

Season 1 (2022)

Season 2  (2023)

References

External links
Official Show Website

2020s American reality television series
2022 American television series debuts
American television spin-offs
English-language television shows
Teenage pregnancy in television
Television series about teenagers
MTV reality television series
Reality television spin-offs